In mathematical optimization and related fields, relaxation is a modeling strategy.  A relaxation is an approximation of a difficult problem by a nearby problem that is easier to solve. A solution of the relaxed problem provides information about the original problem.

For example, a linear programming relaxation of an integer programming problem  removes the integrality constraint and so allows non-integer rational solutions. A Lagrangian relaxation of a complicated problem in combinatorial optimization penalizes violations of some constraints, allowing an easier relaxed problem to be solved. Relaxation techniques complement or supplement branch and bound algorithms of combinatorial optimization; linear programming and Lagrangian relaxations are used to obtain bounds in branch-and-bound algorithms for integer programming.

The modeling strategy of relaxation should not be confused with iterative methods of relaxation,  such as successive over-relaxation (SOR); iterative methods of relaxation are used in solving problems in differential equations, linear least-squares, and linear programming. However, iterative methods of relaxation have been used to solve Lagrangian relaxations.

Definition 
A relaxation of the minimization problem

 

is another minimization problem of the form

with these two properties

 
  for all .

The first property states that the original problem's feasible domain is a subset of the relaxed problem's feasible domain. The second property states that the original problem's objective-function is greater than or equal to the relaxed problem's objective-function.

Properties

If in addition to the previous assumptions, the following holds: If an optimal solution for the relaxed problem is feasible for the original problem, then it is optimal for the original problem.

Some relaxation techniques
Linear programming relaxation
Lagrangian relaxation

Semidefinite relaxation
 Surrogate relaxation and duality

Notes

References
 
 
 
  Translated by Steven Vajda from 
 
 

 W. R. Pulleyblank, Polyhedral combinatorics (pp. 371–446);
 George L. Nemhauser and Laurence A. Wolsey, Integer programming (pp. 447–527);
 Claude Lemaréchal, Nondifferentiable optimization (pp. 529–572);

 
 

 
Mathematical optimization
Approximations